|}

The Prelude Handicap Chase is a Listed National Hunt chase in Great Britain which is open to horses aged four years or older. It is run at Market Rasen over a distance of about 2 miles, five furlongs and 110 yards (4,325 metres), and it is scheduled to take place each year in September.

The race was first run in 2004 and was awarded Listed status in 2008.

Winners

See also
 List of British National Hunt races

References
Racing Post:

National Hunt chases
National Hunt races in Great Britain
Market Rasen Racecourse